Circulus is a double LP released under jazz pianist Chick Corea’s name, featuring performances recorded in 1970 by the free jazz group Circle, which was first released on the Blue Note label in 1978.

Reception 
The Allmusic review by Scott Yanow awarded the album 4½ stars stating "The music is generally quite difficult with sound explorations emphasized over melodic development, and is much closer to the direction that Braxton would explore than what Corea would be playing two years later. But open-eared listeners who enjoy avant-garde jazz will find much to savor during these fascinating performances from one of the new music's top (if short-lived) regular groups".

Track listing 
All compositions by Chick Corea, Anthony Braxton, Dave Holland, Barry Altschul except where noted.

Side One
 "Drone" (Corea, Holland, Altschul) - 22:25 
Side Two
 "Quartet Piece No. 1" - 16:13 
Side Three
 "Quartet Piece No. 2" - 17:33 
Side Four
 "Quartet Piece No. 3" - 12:25  
 "Percussion Piece" - 5:52  
Recorded at A&R Studios in New York City on April 8, 1970 (Side One), August 19, 1970 (Side Four, track 2), and August 21, 1970 (Side Two, Side Three & Side Four, track 1).

Personnel
 Chick Corea – piano, celeste, vibes, percussion 
 Anthony Braxton – alto saxophone, soprano saxophone, flute, clarinet, contrabass clarinet, percussion (Side Two, Side Three and Side Four)
 Dave Holland – bass, cello, guitar, percussion  
 Barry Altschul – drums, percussion

See also 
 Chick Corea discography
 Anthony Braxton discography

References 

1978 albums
Blue Note Records albums
Chick Corea albums
Circle (jazz band) albums